Sakaraha is a district located in Atsimo-Andrefana Region, south-western Madagascar.

Communes
The district is further divided into 11 communes:

 Ambinany
 Amboronabo
 Andalamasina Vineta
 Andranolava
 Bereketa
 Mahaboboka
 Miary Lamatihy
 Miary Taheza
 Mihavatsy
 Mikoboka
 Mitsinjo, Sakaraha
 Sakaraha

Geography
Sakaraha is situated along route nationale No. 7 (Tuléar-Fianarantsoa) at 134 km from Tuléar, 64 km from Andranovory and 84 km from Ilakaka. Zombitse-Vohibasia National Park is located in the district, east of the town of Sakaraha. Analavelona Massif is in the western portion of the district.

References

Districts of Atsimo-Andrefana